Reunion is a space strategy video game. It was the first game by Hungarian game developer company Amnesty Design (now Digital Reality) and was released by the British publisher Grandslam Entertainment. In North America, it was sublicensed to Merit Studios and released under the name Merit's Galactic Reunion. The game was programmed by János Kistamás, Krisztián Jámbor, and Attila Lendvai (Amiga), István Kiss (MS-DOS). The soundtrack was made by Tamás Kreiner.

Plot
In the 27th century, centuries of peace have allowed great scientific progress in the development of the first interstellar warp drive. Two research ships, designated Explorer-1 and Explorer-2, are outfitted with the experimental drives and sent to find new planets for colonization. Only Explorer-2 returns to Earth out of the two Explorers. Refitted as a colony vessel, the Explorer-2 is once again ready to embark when, suddenly, peace is disrupted and the humans were ripped apart from each other. At this same time, a planet-wide rebellion stages a great coup and overthrows the Earthen government, throwing the world into chaos and severing the union. The Explorer-2, crewed by a loyalist space crew, barely escapes the rebellion and leaves the Solar System. Years later after the rebellion, the Explorer-2 arrives damaged at its destination and a colony is set up, naming it New Earth. After many generations of being separated from Earth, the colony is self-sufficient enough to develop a mission only the best can tread: Explore nearby space, research new technologies, harvest resources, develop a space fleet and eventually reconquer and reunify Earth, leading to the greatest reunion the universe has ever set its eyes on.

Reception

Magazine "Amiga Joker" reviewed it and gave 85 points out of 100 for the OCS version and 86 out of 100 for the AGA version.
Magazine "GURU" reviewed it and gave 92 points out of 100.
Magazine "PC Joker" reviewed it and gave 85 points out of 100.

References

External links

Amiga games
DOS games
Real-time strategy video games
Video games developed in Hungary
Science fiction video games
1994 video games
Digital Reality games
Single-player video games
Merit Studios games